In 1984, the Yorkshire area had a total of 56 collieries. The last deep coal mine was Kellingley Colliery which closed on Friday 18 December 2015 signalling the end of deep coal mining not only in Yorkshire but in Britain as a whole. Hatfield Colliery closed in mid 2015.

In 1984, 15 of the collieries were in the Wakefield district, 11 in the Rotherham district, 10 in the Barnsley district, 9 in the Doncaster district, 6 in the Selby district, 3 in the Leeds district and 2 in the Kirklees district.  The Yorkshire Area of the Coal Board also included Manton  and Shireoaks collieries, which were geographically in Nottinghamshire; they closed in 1994 and 1990 respectively.

References

 Colin Jackson, The Complete A-Z of Colliery Names, Pre-1947 Owners, Areas & Dates, Volume 2, published by the National Coal Mining Museum for England, 2002.
 Coal Mining in the British Isles, Northern Mine Research Society

 
History of Yorkshire
Yorkshire-related lists
Yorkshire